Narayanan, better known by his stage name Sivachandran, is an Indian actor, director, and writer who was active in Tamil cinema mostly in the 1980s.

Career 
Sivachandran was originally offered to act in Kizhakke Pogum Rail (1978), but declined. He made his film debut in Pattina Pravesam (1977) as one of the lead actors. He later starred in Annapoorani (1978) with R. Muthuraman in a negative role. He went on to star in notable films include Aval Appadithan (1978) and  Polladhavan (1980). He made his directorial debut with  En Uyir Kannamma (1988) and went on to direct several films with Prabhu.

Personal life 

Sivachandran was born as Narayanan, in Valparai, in Coimbatore district. He changed his name to Sivachandran and started his acting career. The stage name is a portmanteau of "Siva" from Sivaji Ganesan and "Chandran" from M. G. Ramachandran.

Sivachandran fell in love with actress Lakshmi on the sets of the film En Uyir Kannamma. Both of them  got married in 1987. He collaborated with Lakshmi again in Raththa Dhanam (1988) and Jodi Sendhachu (1992), which was directed by Lakshmi herself. Sivachandran and Lakshmi adopted a  girl, Samyuktha, in 2000.

Filmography

As actor 
Films

Television
Arasi (Sun TV)
Mahalakshmi (Kalaignar TV)

As director 
 En Uyir Kannamma (1988)
 Raththa Dhanam (1988)
 Hosa Kavya  (1989; Kannada)
 Nyayangal Jayikkattum (1990)
 Satya Jwale (1995; Kannada)
 Manam Virumbuthe Unnai (1999)

As story writer 
 Anbe Odi Vaa (1984)
 Sankar Guru (1987)

As dialogue writer 
 Anand (1987)

References

External links 

20th-century Indian male actors
Indian film directors
Indian male film actors
Living people
Male actors in Tamil cinema
Tamil film directors
Tamil male actors
Year of birth missing (living people)